Milan Bortel (born 7 April 1987) is a Slovak footballer who plays as a centre back for Austrian club SV Gols.

Club career
Bortel started his professional career as a central defender for the youth team of Dubnica in 1998, and remained at the club until 2005, when he transferred to Italian Serie D club,  Manduria Calcio. In his first season, he managed 28 appearances. Following several impressive displays, he joined Serie C1 side Manfredonia in 2006. Bortel became a key figure to their defence line.

In January 2009, FIFA Dispute Resolution Chamber rejected Bortel's youth club's Dubnica claim  for training compensation from Manfredonia, following several disagreements regarding the transfer.

On 25 June 2009, he was officially signed by Calcio Catania on a four-year contract. Shortly, he was sent back to the Lega Pro Prima Divisione with SPAL in co-ownership deal. In his first season with the club, Bortel made 21 league appearances, and in the summer of 2010, SPAL signed the Slovakian defender permanently from Catania. He remained at SPAL for the 2010–11 Lega Pro season, before transferring to Sereď in his native country in March 2012.
At the end of the 2011–12 season, Bortel was transferred to Zlaté Moravce.

In January 2013, he moved to Slavia Prague.

He was transferred to Spartak Trnava in June 2014. He made his league debut for them against his former side, Zlaté Moravce, on 13 July 2014.

References

External links

1987 births
Living people
People from Ilava
Sportspeople from the Trenčín Region
2. Liga (Austria) players
Expatriate footballers in Italy
Expatriate footballers in the Czech Republic
Expatriate footballers in Austria
Association football defenders
Slovak expatriate footballers
Slovak expatriate sportspeople in Austria
Slovak expatriate sportspeople in Italy
Slovak expatriate sportspeople in the Czech Republic
Slovak footballers
Manfredonia Calcio players
Catania S.S.D. players
S.P.A.L. players
FC ViOn Zlaté Moravce players
SK Slavia Prague players
ŠKF Sereď players
FC Spartak Trnava players
SV Horn players
Serie C players
Slovak Super Liga players
2. Liga (Slovakia) players
Czech First League players
Austrian Regionalliga players